Marbury Creek is a stream in the U.S. state of Georgia. It is a tributary to the Apalachee River.

Marbury Creek was named after the family of Leonard Marbury, a pioneer settler.

References

Rivers of Georgia (U.S. state)
Rivers of Barrow County, Georgia
Rivers of Oconee County, Georgia